The 2010–11 Cornell Big Red women's ice hockey team will represent Cornell University in the 2010–11 NCAA Division I women's ice hockey season. The Big Red will be coached by Doug Derraugh and assisted by Dani Bilodeau and Edith Zimmering.  The Big Red is a member of the Eastern College Athletic Conference and will attempt to win the NCAA Women's Ice Hockey Championship. The Big Red were ranked eighth nationally, had a 17–8–6 overall, and posted a 14–2–6 record in ECAC Hockey last season. All of their home games will be played at Lynah Rink.

Offseason
 August 15: Eight players are selected for the Canadian U-22 team roster  The players include: forwards Rebecca Johnston, Brianne Jenner, Catherine White, Jessica Campbell, and Chelsea Karpenko. The defense includes Laura Fortino and Laurianne Rougeau. Amanda Mazzotta will be the goaltender.
 Cornell head coach Doug Derraugh participated in the evaluation camp for the senior 2010–11 Canadian national women's team. He was a head coach for Canada Blue (the camp was divided into four teams, Red, White, Yellow, Blue). Jessica Campbell played for Canada Red, Brianne Jenner, Rebecca Johnston, Catherine White and goalie Amanda Mazzotta played for Canada White. Laura Fortino, Lauriane Rougeau and Chelsea Karpenko played for Canada Blue.
 September 28: In the USA Today/USA Hockey Magazine Women's College Hockey Poll, the Big Red have been voted as the pre-season Number 2.

Exhibition

Regular season
 Jessica Campbell scored four goals against the Robert Morris Colonials in a 9–1 triumph. Two of her scores came on the power play.
 Oct 29-30: Brianne Jenner factored in both victories for the Big Red over the weekend. On October 29, she had three assists at Quinnipiac. The following day, she notched a pair of goals and added an assist Saturday at Princeton. Amanda Mazzotta allowed only two goals in two games. On October 29, versus Quinnipiac, she stopped 24 of 25 shots. The following day, she stopped 18 of 19 as the Big Red bested Princeton.
 January 7–8: Cornell freshman goaltender Lauren Slebodnik earned two shutouts in her first two career starts. On January 7, she made her NCAA debut by shutting out Yale by a 5-0 margin. With Cornell dressing just 12 skaters, she stopped all 23 Yale shots. The following night, Slebodnik shut out the Brown Bears by a 3-0 mark. Cornell only dressed 11 skaters for the game and she stopped all 15 shots.
 Jan 18: Cornell senior Karlee Overguard scored twice, while freshman Lauren Slebodnick made 24 saves to secure a 3-0 victory at Mercyhurst. The win for Cornell avenged the only loss for the Big Red on the season, a 4-3 loss to the Lakers back in November at Lynah Rink. Hillary Pattenden stopped 29 of the 32 shots she faced on the night in taking the loss.
 In January 2011, for the second time in three weeks, Slebodnik was named the ECAC Hockey Goaltender of the Week. She claimed the honor after another week that saw her post a pair of shutouts in three games, including a 3-0 victory versus Number Four ranked Mercyhurst on Jan. 18. The shutout victory versus Mercyhurst marked the first time in nearly two years that the club was shut out. In addition, it  was the first time since October 2005 that Mercyhurst had been shut out during the regular season.

She made 24 saves in the victory versus Mercyhurst. She followed by making 12 saves on 13 shots on January 21 in a 6-1 win against Colgate. The following day, she finished her week with her fourth shutout of the year in six starts. She made 14 saves in a 5-0 whitewashing of Colgate.

With the three straight wins, Cornell has extended their winning streak to 16 straight contests. During the regular season, they are unbeaten in ECAC Hockey action. Slebodnick filled in for junior Amanda Mazzotta during the month of January while Mazzotta was out with an injury. With Mazzotta, the goaltending duo has coupled to claim five of the nine goaltender of the week awards handed out by the league during weeks that Cornell has played.

Standings

Roster

Schedule
(nc) stands for non-conference 
Home Games in BOLD

Conference record

Player stats

Skaters

Goaltenders

Postseason
 March 12: The Big Red advanced to its second consecutive Frozen Four with a 7-1 defeat of Dartmouth in the NCAA regional.
The team matched an NCAA tournament record for goals in a game. The Big Red's 31 victories are the most by any Big Red hockey team, men's or women's, surpassing the 30-win men's hockey team of 2002-03 that advanced to the Frozen Four. Chelsea Karpenko scored two goals and had an assist, while Catherine White had one goal and two assists.

ECAC tournament

NCAA tournament

Awards and honors
 Jessica Campbell, MLX Skates Rookie of the Week (Week of October 26)
 Jessica Campbell, MLX Skates Rookie of the Week (Week of March 7)
 Hayley Hughes, MLX Skates Player of the Week (Week of March 7)
 Brianne Jenner, ECAC MLX Skates Rookie of the Week (Week of November 2, 2010)
 Brianne Jenner, ECAC MLX Skates Rookie of the Week (Week of February 1, 2011)
 Brianne Jenner, ECAC MLX Skates Rookie of the Week (Week of March 1, 2011)
 Rebecca Johnston, ECAC Player of the Week (Week of January 11, 2011)
 Rebecca Johnston, ECAC Player of the Week (Week of March 1, 2011)
 Amanda Mazzotta, ECAC MLX Skates Goaltender of the Week (Week of November 2, 2010)
 Amanda Mazzotta, ECAC MLX Skates Goaltender of the Week (Week of November 23, 2010)
 Amanda Mazzotta, ECAC MLX Skates Goaltender of the Week (Week of March 7, 2011)
 Amanda Mazzotta, Winter 2011 All-Ivy Academic Team 
 Karlee Overguard, ECAC co-Defensive Forward of the Year
 Lauriane Rougeau, ECAC top Defensive Defenseman
 Lauren Slebodnik, ECAC MLX Skates Rookie of the Week (Week of January 11, 2011)
 Lauren Slebodnik, ECAC MLX Skates Rookie of the Week (Week of January 25, 2011)

Team awards
Laura Fortino, Robert D. "Bob" Brunet '41 Most Valuable Player
Hayley Hughes and Karlee Overguard, Helanie Fisher Hebble '84 Unsung Hero award
Hayley Hughes, Kate Hallada Pinhey '83 Most Improved Player Award
Hayley Hughes, Jenna Paulson and Lauriane Rougeau, Wendell Earle Academic Award

Amber Overguard and Amanda Mazzotta, William F. Fuerst, Jr., '39 Big Red Player of the Year Award
Catherine White, TGHA Cub Club Mentor Award
Brianne Jenner, Class of '41 Rookie of the Year

All-ECAC honors
 Doug Derraugh, ECAC Coach of the Year

First team
 Forward: Rebecca Johnston, Cornell
 Forward: Brianne Jenner, Cornell
 Defense: Laura Fortino, Cornell
 Defense: Lauriane Rougeau, Cornell

Second team
 Forward: Chelsea Karpenko, Cornell

Third team
 Forward: Catherine White, Cornell

All-rookie team
 Forward: Brianne Jenner, Cornell
 Defense: Alyssa Gagliardi, Cornell

Postseason honors
 Chelsea Karpenko, ECAC tournament Most Outstanding Player
 Doug Derraugh, Finalist, 2011 AHCA Women's Ice Hockey Division I Coach of the Year

All-America selections
 Laura Fortino, 2011 First Team All-America selection
 Rebecca Johnston, 2011 Second Team All-America selection
 Lauriane Rougeau, 2011 Second Team All-America selection

Ivy League honors
Laura Fortino, 2010-11 Ivy League Player of the Year
Brianne Jenner, 2010-11 Ivy League Rookie of the Year
 Brianne Jenner, 2010-11 First Team All-Ivy
  Rebecca Johnston, 2010-11 First Team All-Ivy
  Chelsea Karpenko, 2010-11 First Team All-Ivy
  Laura Fortino, 2010-11 First Team All-Ivy
 Catherine White, 2010-11 Second Team All-Ivy
 Lauriane Rougeau, 2010-11 Second Team All-Ivy

See also
 2010–11 College Hockey America women's ice hockey season
 2010–11 ECAC women's ice hockey season
 2009–10 Cornell Big Red women's ice hockey season

References

External links
 Cornell Official site
 Cornell ECAC hockey site

C
C
NCAA women's ice hockey Frozen Four seasons
Cornell Big Red women's ice hockey seasons
Cornell
Cornell